Michael Ruhe (born 3 April 1980 in Rinteln) is a German rower. He finished fourth in the eight at the 2004 Summer Olympics.

References 
 
 

1980 births
Living people
People from Rinteln
Olympic rowers of Germany
Rowers at the 2004 Summer Olympics
German male rowers
World Rowing Championships medalists for Germany
Sportspeople from Lower Saxony